Cristin Milioti (born August 16, 1985) is an American actress. She is known for playing Tracy McConnell in the CBS sitcom How I Met Your Mother from 2013 to 2014, and for her work in theater productions such as That Face, Stunning, and the Tony Award-winning musical Once, for which she won a Grammy Award and was nominated for a Tony Award. She has also played Teresa Petrillo Belfort in the 2013 film The Wolf of Wall Street, Sarah Wilder in the 2020 film Palm Springs, Betsy Solverson in the second season of Fargo (2015), Hazel Green in the HBO Max comedy series Made for Love (2021–2022), and Emma in the Peacock black comedy mystery series The Resort (2022-).

Early life
Milioti was born on August 16, 1985, in Cherry Hill, New Jersey. She is of Italian descent, and calls her family "Olive Garden Italian". In middle school, she found her love of acting at Long Lake Camp for the Arts in Long Lake, New York. She graduated in 2003 from Cherry Hill High School East, where she began performing in school plays. She took acting classes at New York University, but dropped out during her sophomore year. Milioti admitted that she was "wildly unhappy there" and dropped out as a result.

Career
Milioti's first acting roles were bit parts in national advertising campaign ads, notably one for the Ford Edge. She also appeared in television programs such as The Sopranos and films such as Greetings from the Shore. Milioti is also known for her stage performances. In 2007, she appeared on Broadway as Alice Ashbrook in Helen Edmundson's award-winning adaptation of Jamila Gavin's novel Coram Boy. In 2010, she starred in That Face, and was nominated for a Lucille Lortel Award  for Outstanding Lead Actress for her work in Stunning. In 2012, she received a Tony Award nomination for Best Actress in a Musical for her work in Once, a play in which she had performed from 2011 to 2013. Her Once performance, with fellow principal soloist Steve Kazee, earned the 2013 Grammy Award for Best Musical Theater Album. She also read aloud a short story for the 2011 This American Life episode "Adventure". In 2012, she appeared on several songs of Glen Hansard's debut album Rhythm and Repose.

In 2013, Milioti was cast in the CBS sitcom How I Met Your Mother as the titular Mother, appearing for the first time in the season eight finale titled "Something New", and was promoted to a series regular for the show's ninth and final season. Milioti portrayed Jordan Belfort's first wife, Teresa Petrillo, in the 2013 Martin Scorsese film The Wolf of Wall Street. In February 2014, she was cast as Zelda, the female lead on NBC's comedy A to Z which premiered that October and aired for one season of 13 episodes. In 2015, she co-starred on the second season of FX's Fargo as Betsy Solverson, the cancer-stricken wife of state trooper Lou Solverson and mother of future deputy Molly Solverson. In 2017, Milioti appeared in the fourth season of the sci-fi anthology show Black Mirror in the episode "USS Callister" as Nanette Cole, a newly employed game developer whose digital recreation becomes trapped in a virtual simulator game.

In 2020, Milioti starred in the critically acclaimed sci-fi/comedy Palm Springs, which premiered at the Sundance Film Festival in January and on Hulu in July. In 2021, she starred in the HBO Max dark comedy series Made for Love as the entrapped wife of a tech billionaire from whom she runs away.

In 2023, Milioti is set to star as Sofia Falcone in HBO Max spin-off miniseries of The Batman titled The Penguin, opposite Colin Farrell.

Filmography

Film

Television

Theatre

Awards and nominations

References

External links

 
 
 

1985 births
Living people
21st-century American actresses
Actresses from New Jersey
American film actresses
American musical theatre actresses
American people of Italian descent
American stage actresses
American television actresses
Cherry Hill High School East alumni
Grammy Award winners
People from Cherry Hill, New Jersey
Tisch School of the Arts alumni